Events from the year 1876 in Russia.

Incumbents
 Monarch – Alexander II

Events

 
 
  
  
 Marche slave
 Saint Petersburg Art and Industry Academy
 Reichstadt Agreement
 Kazan demonstration

Births

 Nikolay Dukhonin, White Army General, casualty of the Russian Civil War.

Deaths

References

1876 in Russia
Years of the 19th century in the Russian Empire